"Ekoi" or "Ejagham" may refer to:

 Ekoi people, a group of people found in south-eastern Nigeria, also known as Ejagham
 Ekoid languages, the language spoken by the Ekoi people of south-eastern Nigeria
 Ekoi mythology
 Lake Ejagham, a small lake in western Cameroon